Torben Christensen (born 14 July 1963) is a Danish former footballer who played as a midfielder. He made three appearances for the Denmark national team from 1984 to 1985.

References

External links
 

1963 births
Living people
Danish men's footballers
Association football midfielders
Denmark international footballers
Danish Superliga players
Swiss Super League players
Ikast FS players
FC St. Gallen players
Aarhus Gymnastikforening players
Danish expatriate men's footballers
Danish expatriate sportspeople in Switzerland
Expatriate footballers in Switzerland
People from Hjørring Municipality
Sportspeople from the North Jutland Region